The Baoquan Pumped Storage Power Station is a pumped-storage hydroelectric power station located  northeast of Jiaozuo in Henan Province, China. It was constructed between June 2004 and December 2011 and has a  installed capacity. The power station operates by shifting water between an upper and lower reservoir to generate electricity.

Upper Baoquan Reservoir
The walls around the reservoir are blanketed with concrete and asphalt. The upper reservoir has a  storage capacity of which  can be used for power generation.

Baoquan Reservoir
The lower reservoir was formed by raising the height of the existing Lower Baoquan Dam while the Upper Baoquan Reservoir is located in a valley above the north side of the lower reservoir. During periods of low energy demand, such as at night, water is pumped from Baoquan Reservoir up to the upper reservoir. When energy demand is high, the water is released back down to the lower reservoir but the pump turbines that pumped the water up now reverse mode and serve as generators to produce electricity. The process is repeated as necessary and the plant serves as a peaking power plant.

While generating electricity, the pump-generators produce 2,010 million kWh annually but consumes 2,642 million kWh when pumping. Pumping when energy is low in demand and cheap helps cover the excess cost.

See also

List of pumped-storage power stations

References

Energy infrastructure completed in 2011
Hydroelectric power stations in Henan
Pumped-storage hydroelectric power stations in China
2011 establishments in China
Dams completed in 2011
Concrete-face rock-fill dams